Sami Schalk is an Associate Professor in the Department of Gender & Women's Studies at the University of Wisconsin - Madison. She was previously an Assistant Professor in the English Department at the University at Albany, SUNY.

In 2019 she started the campaign #twerkwithlizzo, combining fun with larger issues relating to racism, sexism and fatphobia as a form of "pleasure activism". Her twerking with Lizzo went viral and made her the Professor who twerked with Lizzo.

Cultural Significance 

Schalk twerked with Lizzo onstage on October 10, 2019.

Education

Schalk received her B.A. in English & Women's Studies in 2008, with a minor in Disability Studies, from Miami University, and her M.F.A. in Creative Writing from the University of Notre Dame in 2010. She received her PhD in Gender Studies from Indiana University in 2014.

Publications

Schalk has published numerous journal articles, book chapters, essays, reviews, and popular articles. In 2018, she published a monograph titled "Bodyminds Reimagined: (Dis)ability, Race, and Gender in Black Women’s Speculative Fiction."

References

University of Wisconsin–Madison faculty
Living people
Disability studies academics
Year of birth missing (living people)
Women's studies academics
American women non-fiction writers
University at Albany, SUNY faculty